The Bösendorfer and Yamaha USASU International Piano Competition is a biennial piano competition held at Arizona State University's Herberger Institute for Design and the Arts since 2006. The competition has three categories: Yamaha Junior for pianists ages 13-15; Yamaha Senior for pianists ages 16-18; and Bosendorfer for pianists ages 19-32. It awards over $50,000 in prize money.

Prize winners

Bosendorfer

Yamaha Senior

Yamaha Junior

Medal table

References

External links 
 

Piano competitions in the United States
Bösendorfer